Copenhagen Series for men, unofficially also known as Københavnerserien and often shortened to KS serien and KS Herre, is the highest division for men organised by the regional football association DBU København (DBUK) and one of the sixth-highest divisions overall in the Danish football league system.

The league, deciding the Copenhagen Football Championship, was introduced as a tournament exclusively for amateur clubs located in Copenhagen beginning with the 1889–90 season under the auspices of the Danish Football Association (DBU). With the formation of a regional association for the Copenhagen area in 1903, the administration of the league was handed over to the newly founded Københavns Boldspil-Union (KBU). At the time of the league's inception, it was the top flight of the Danish football league system featuring the best teams in the country, but it has since been moved to its current status as the sixth best level in Danish football, after a long period as the fifth best level, and now features lower ranking amateur clubs from the Copenhagen area and Bornholm including the reserve squads of clubs playing at the Danish third league tier or above.

The division has changed its name on numerous occasions. It has previously been known as Fodboldturneringen (1889/90–1905/06), A-rækken (1906/07–1919/20; or KBUs A-række, Række A1), Mesterskabsrækken (1920/21–1935/36; or KBUs Mesterskabsrække to distinguish it from the other regional leagues; unofficially shortened to Mesterrækken), A-rækken (1936/37–1946/47), Københavnsserien A and Københavnsserien B (1947/48–1977; groups A and B respectively), before settling with the current name of Københavnsserien beginning with the 1978-season, eventually being known as Københavnsserien for Herrer since the 1985-season to distinguish it from the women's corresponding regional league.

History 
Only clubs located in Copenhagen participated in the tournaments organised by the Danish Football Association (DBU) from the foundation in 1889 until 1903, when the regional football association, Copenhagen Football Association (KBU) was formed and took over the administration of all Copenhagen-related activities including the tournaments. In the first 14 years under the auspices of the DBU, the participants played once or twice against everyone in a league format (unlike the cup-format used for the Medaille-Fodbold-Turneringen held in 1888) and the season was usually initiated in November and lasted until March the following year. Akademisk Boldklub was the most successful team in the DBU-era with six championship titles. In October 1889, the association invited the potential participants to join its first football tournament, simply named Football Tournament or Fodboldturneringen. At the time of the league's inception, it was the top flight of the Danish football league system featuring the best teams in the country, but the league winners are not considered official Danish champions.

At the Copenhagen FA's general meeting on 26 February 1920, a new tournament system was adopted. KBU's highest division, A-rækken, was renamed Mesterskabsrækken with the five biggest teams all owners of a football field (Kjøbenhavns Boldklub, Akademisk Boldklub, Boldklubben af 1893, Boldklubben Frem and Boldklubben 1903) under KBU as participants, while the name A-rækken was retained for KBU's second highest division, containing teams not owning a football field, and the third highest league became B-rækken, all tournaments consisting of a first, second and third team tournament. At the same time, the promotion and relegation rules between the Mesterrækken and the new A-rækken were overhauled making it more difficult for winners of A-rækken to achieve a promotion. In 1936, KBU's highest division, Mesterskabsrækken, was dissolved as a result of the introduction to the double format to the nationwide leagues organized by the Danish Football Association (DBU), allowing KBU's previous second level league, A-rækken, to become the new highest division involving 16 first teams.

From 1912 to 1927 the league served as the Copenhagen qualifier for the Landsfodboldturneringen, a national playoff to elect a Danish Champion. The Landsfodboldturneringen was won by a team from Copenhagen all the times contested. From 1927 to 1936 it coexisted with the Danmarksturneringen i fodbold with the best Copenhagen teams competing in both competitions.

With the formation of Denmark Series, beginning with the 1966-season, reserve teams were now allowed to participate at the fourth level. Between 1966 and 1977, the winner of the regular league (group A) played two playoff matches against the highest placed qualified reserve league team (group B) for one promotion spot to Denmark Series. The overall loser of the two matches entered the additional home and away playoff matches against the runners-up of the Zealand Series for the right to enter Denmark Series. The winners of the regular league managed to secure their spot in the Denmark Series by winning in the seasons between 1967 and 1973, while teams originating from the reserve league won promotion the other years. From the 1978-season the two divisions were merged into one regular league, features both first teams and reserve teams.

Competition format 
Below is a complete record of the number of teams in each season throughout the league's history (not including group 2 between 1947/48 and 1977):

Primary league entrants (1889/90–present)
 3 clubs: 1894/95–95/96
 5 clubs: 1891/92–93/94, 1896/97, 1899/1900–1903/04, 1905/06–1907/08, 1920/21–22/23
 6 clubs: 1897/98–98/99, 1904/05, 1908/09–17/18, 1923/24–29/30
 7 clubs: 1889/90–90/91, 1918/19–19/20
 8 clubs: 1930/31–35/36
 10 clubs: 1947/48–1964, 1969–72
 12 clubs: 1965–68, 1973–77, 1980–81, 1983–88, 1992
 13 clubs: 1979, 1982
 14 clubs: 1978, 1989–91, 1993–2008, 2009–present
 16 clubs: 1936/37–46/47
 Transition tournament: 2008

Reserve league entrants (1947/48–1977)
 10 clubs: 1947/48–52/53, 1954/55–1958
 11 clubs: 1953/54, 1969
 12 clubs: 1959–63, 1965–66, 1968, 1970–77
 13 clubs: 1964, 1967

A single round-robin schedule was used between the seasons 1889/90 and 1891/92, 1896/97–97/98 and 1930/31–1946/47, while a double round-robin schedule have been used in the early seasons between 1892/93 and 1895/96, between 1898/99 and 1929/30, and again since the 1947/48-season. The 1956/57-season was a transition season, where each team met each other three times during the tournament. Until the 1994-season, a win equaled 2 points and a draw 1 point, which changed from the 1995-season, where a win earned the team 3 points. From the 1947/48-season to the 1997-season, an additional league on the same level as the Københavnsserien was present, but only reserve teams for higher ranking teams could participate, while first teams were placed in group A. The 2008 fall-season was a transition tournament.

Copenhagen Championship winners 
The winner in a given season wins the Copenhagen Championship and is automatically promoted to the Denmark Series. The runner-up enters a home/away promotion playoff against teams from the highest leagues of the other regional associations for the right to enter the Denmark Series. Teams placing in the bottom are automatically relegated to either the Series 1, group 1 (first team), Series 1, group 2 (reserve teams) or Bornholm Series (teams belonging to DBU Bornholm). Depending on the number of teams, that are members of FBU Funen, relegated from Denmark Series, the number of teams relegated to Series 1 will be either increased or decreased.

The Football Tournament/Fodboldturneringen (1889–1906)

A-rækken (1906–1920)

Mesterskabsrækken (1920–1936)

A-rækken (1936–1947)

Københavnsserien A / Københavnsserien B (1947–1977)

Københavnsserien (1978–)

Footnotes

References 

Denmark
5
Sports leagues established in 1889
Copenhagen Football Championship